The Philippines participated in the 1966 Asian Games held in Bangkok, Thailand from December 9 to December 20, 1966. Ranked 10th with 2 gold medals, 15 silver medals and 25 bronze medals with a total of 42 over-all medals.

Asian Games performance
The Philippines won only two gold medals, courtesy of all-around athlete Josephine de la Vina and boxer Rodolfo Arpon, who was the lone gold medalist of the four-man boxing team, ruling the lightweight class.

The Philippine delegation of 147 athletes that competed in 12 sports also won 15 silvers and 25 bronzes. The Games also saw the end of the country's reign as Asia's basketball king, with the RP nationals managing a poor sixth behind champion Israel.

Medalists

The following Philippine competitors won medals at the Games.

Gold

Silver

Bronze

Multiple

Medal summary

Medals by sports

References

Nations at the 1966 Asian Games
1966
Asian Games